Izatha apodoxa is a moth of the family Oecophoridae. It is endemic to New Zealand, where it is known from scattered localities in the southern North Island. This species is variable in appearance and comes in two forms, a grey form and a black and white form. In the grey form it is very similar in appearance to I. notodoxa and in the black and white form to I. katadiktya. At present the larvae and biology of this species is unknown.

Taxonomy 
Edward Meyrick first described this species in 1888 using specimens obtained by A. Purdie and George Hudson in Wellington. Meyrick named the species Semiocosma apodoxa. George Hudson discussed and illustrated this species under its current name of I. apodoxa in 1928. The lectotype specimen is held at the Natural History Museum, London.

Description 
Meyrick described the species as follows:  

The wingspan is 20.5–26.5 mm for males and about 21 mm for females. I. apodoxa is very variable in its forewing pattern and also comes in two forms, a grey form and a black and white form. The grey form of I. apodoxa is indistinctly marked and similar in appearance to  I. notodoxa. These two species are not reliably distinguished on external characters but can be distinguished by the male genital characters as well as by their geographical location. I. apodoxa is only found in the North Island and I. notodoxa in the South Island. The black and white form of I. apodoxa is  similar in appearance to I. katadiktya. The two species can be distinguished by examining the basal patch on the forewing. In well marked specimens of I. apodoxa the forewing has no pale inclusion below the fold but with I. katadiktya it almost always contains a white or pale grey patch.

Distribution 
This species is endemic to New Zealand. It is restricted to the North Island and can be found south from Taupo in scattered locations. Other than the type locality of Wellington it has also been found Taranaki, Hawkes Bay, Rangitikei and Wairarapa. Only the grey form of this species has been found in Wellington and very few specimens have been collected outside of this locality. Specimens obtained in Taranaki and Rangitikei have been of the black and white form but examination of the genitalia has shown they are of the same species.

Biology and behaviour 
The larvae and biology of this species is currently unknown. Adults of this species have been recorded in December and January. Hudson states that the species has been seen in November and adults could be found resting on fences in Wellington city.

Habitat and host species 
It is likely that the larvae of this species either consumes decomposing plant matter, dead wood or alternatively fungi or lichens.

References

External links
 
 Photograph of lectotype specimen

Oecophorinae
Taxa named by Edward Meyrick
Moths of New Zealand
Endemic fauna of New Zealand
Moths described in 1888
Endemic moths of New Zealand